The busiest airports in Malaysia are measured according to data presented by Malaysia Airports Holdings Berhad. Among all top 20 busiest airports, the Kuala Lumpur International Airport (KLIA) is the only airport which can land the A380. KLIA also has the longest runway in Malaysia, with 1 4,124 and 2 4,000 m runways.

Passenger traffic 

A passenger is described as a person who departs, arrives or passes in condition of transit through any airport located between the borders of Malaysia at any point of time during a year. The data presented here includes the total number of departure, arrival and transit passengers for the years selected, and for both domestic and international flights arriving in scheduled and non-scheduled services.

Cargo traffic
The following is a list of 10 busiest airports in Malaysia in terms of cargo handling traffic. The cargo numbers are in metric tonnes.

Aircraft movements

Commercial aircraft movements
The following is a list of the 10 busiest airports in Malaysia in terms of number of commercial aircraft movements (take-off and landing).

Total aircraft movements
The following is a list of the 10 busiest airports in Malaysia in terms of total aircraft movements (take-off and landing). This may include commercial, private, training and military aircraft.

Busiest air routes

The busiest air route between two airports within Malaysia is the Kuala Lumpur - Kota Kinabalu sector. This sector is also the 45th busiest air route in the world for the period of August to September 2011. The second busiest route is the Kuala Lumpur - Kuching sector.

References

External links
KLIA info pages
Malaysia Airports Holdings Berhad
Department of Civil Aviation, Malaysia
Ministry of Transport, Malaysia

Airports in Malaysia
Malaysia